Friendship Association Norway–Albania or VNA was an organization in Norway, supporting political and cultural relations with Albania.

VNA arranged seminars and study trips to Albania. Initially, VNA was dominated by the Socialist Youth League.

In 1979, VNA was divided, based on the Sino-Albanian split. An extraordinary conference of VNA was held. At the conference 67 members of VNA, mainly affiliated with the Communist University League, resigned from the association. This group then founded the Norwegian–Albanian Friendship Association (Norsk-Albansk Vennskapsforening).

References

Norway friendship associations
Albania friendship associations
Political organisations based in Norway